Events in the year 2016 in El Salvador.

Incumbents
President: Salvador Sánchez Cerén
Vice President: Óscar Ortiz

Events

August
 5–21August – 8 athletes from El Salvador competed at the 2016 Summer Olympics in Rio de Janeiro, Brazil.

References

 
2010s in El Salvador
Years of the 21st century in El Salvador
El Salvador